What Fools Men Are is a 1922 American silent comedy drama film directed by George Terwilliger and starring Faire Binney, Lucy Fox, and Huntley Gordon. It is based upon the play The Flapper by Eugene Walter.

Plot
As described in a film magazine review, Peggy Kendricks, the gayest and most daring of society flappers, allows her brother-in-law Bartley Claybourne to secretly pay for her beautiful clothes. Her sister Kate finds discovers the truth and declares that she will name Peggy co-respondent in her divorce proceedings. She goes to Reno under the understanding that Bartley will eventually marry Peggy. However, Peggy has no such notion and suddenly marries Ralph Demarest, a young man whose father Horace detests flappers. Horace offers her money to separate from his son which, true to her form, she accepts. She then uses the money and, in the end, wins the love and respect of her former victims

Cast

References

Bibliography
 Connelly, Robert B. The Silents: Silent Feature Films, 1910-36, Volume 40, Issue 2. December Press, 1998.
 Munden, Kenneth White. The American Film Institute Catalog of Motion Pictures Produced in the United States, Part 1. University of California Press, 1997.

External links
 

1922 films
1922 drama films
1920s English-language films
American silent feature films
Silent American drama films
American black-and-white films
Films directed by George Terwilliger
1920s American films